The Col. C. F. Drake House, at 516 E. Main St. in Weiser, Idaho, was built in 1899.  It was listed on the National Register of Historic Places in 1978.

Date added: January 20, 1978
Architect: Unknown
Architecture: Shingle Style

References

National Register of Historic Places in Washington County, Idaho
Shingle Style architecture in Idaho
Houses completed in 1899